Leucocoma is a genus of flowering plants belonging to the family Ranunculaceae.

Species:

Leucocoma albens 
Leucocoma vegeta

References

Ranunculaceae
Ranunculaceae genera